Neutral Valley, Alberta may refer to:

Neutral Valley, Special Area No. 4, Alberta, a locality in Special Area No. 4, Alberta
Neutral Valley, Parkland County, Alberta, a locality in Parkland County, Alberta